Eternal Springtime is a c. 1884 sculpture by the French artist Auguste Rodin, depicting a pair of lovers. It was created at the same time as The Gates of Hell and originally intended to be part of it.

Gates of Hell
Rodin originally conceived of Eternal Springtime as part of The Gates of Hell, one of the representations of Paolo Malatesta and Francesca da Polenta, but did not include it there because the happiness expressed by the lovers did not seem appropriate to the theme. The Kiss, another famous sculpture by the artist, shares the same origin, but unlike The Kiss in Eternal Springtime the man dominates the composition, sustaining the arching body of his lover that joins him in a passionate kiss.

Description
Rodin took the woman's torso, with its arched pose, from the Torso of Adele that appears in the upper left corner of the tympanum on The Gates of Hell; the model was Adele Abruzzesi, originally from Italy, and for the man Lou Tellegen. However, at the time of his creation of Eternal Springtime, he was in a romantic relationship with Camille Claudel, and Reine-Marie Paris, the granddaughter of Claudel's brother Paul Claudel, has suggested that traces of her can be discerned in the woman of this piece and in other female figures prominent in works he created in the mid-1880s.

Versions
The work was reproduced several times in bronze and marble. A marble version dating to c. 1901 was sold at auction in May 2016 for a then record-breaking $20 million.

Gallery

References

External links

Sculptures by Auguste Rodin
1884 sculptures
Nude sculptures
Sculptures of the Musée Rodin